Vriddhachalam Junction railway station is located in Cuddalore district in the Indian state of  Tamil Nadu and serves Virudhachalam.

History
The South Indian Railway Company laid a -long metre-gauge trunk line from Chennai to Tuticorin in 1880.

With the conversion from metre gauge to broad gauge in the entire Egmore–Tambaram–Villupuram–Tiruchirapalli–Dindigul–Madurai sector virtually complete broad-gauge passenger traffic was initiated in March 2001.

Electrification
The broad-gauge Viluppuram–Tiruchirapalli sector was electrified in 2010.

Despite the fact that most trains bound to South Tamil Nadu stop at this station, this station is only a 'B' grade station.

References

External links
 

Trichy railway division
Railway stations in Cuddalore district
Railway junction stations in Tamil Nadu